"I Need a Hot Girl" is a song by New Orleans hip-hop group, the Hot Boys. The single was featured on their album Guerrilla Warfare. The song, as well as the entire album, was produced by Mannie Fresh. "I Need a Hot Girl" was written by Lil Wayne, B.G. and Turk. Juvenile did not appear on the track, but was featured in the video. The song was moderately successful, peaking at No. 65 on the Billboard Hot 100, the Hot Boys' only single on that chart.

Charts

Weekly charts

Year-end charts

References

External links
 "I Need a Hot Girl" Music Video

Hot Boys songs
Big Tymers songs
Songs written by Lil Wayne
Song recordings produced by Mannie Fresh
Cash Money Records singles
1999 singles
Songs written by Mannie Fresh
Songs written by Birdman (rapper)
1998 songs